Rouillier is a French-origin surname. Notable persons with the surname and associated entities include:

 Chase Roullier (born 1993), American football player
 Groupe Roullier, a French agribusiness founded by Daniel Roullier
 Karl Rouillier (1814-1858), Russian zoologist and paleontologist
 Tim Ryan Rouillier (born 1964), American country singer